This is a list of notable people who have been documented as having heterochromia iridis, a condition when the irises have different colours. People who are frequently mistakenly thought to have heterochromia are not included, but may be listed in the Notes section.

Actors

Gracie Allen
Dan Aykroyd
Àstrid Bergès-Frisbey
Elizabeth Berkley
Kate Bosworth
 Henry Cavill
 Garrett Clayton
Benedict Cumberbatch
Robert Downey, Jr.
 Norma Eberhardt
 Alice Eve
 James Forde
 Alyson Hannigan
 Josh Henderson
Liam James
Mila Kunis
 Jonathan Rhys Meyers
 Colleen Moore
Simon Pegg
Joe Pesci
 Jane Seymour
Dominic Sherwood
Kiefer Sutherland
 Christopher Walken
Olivia Wilde

Athletes and coaches

Shawn Horcoff
Oded Kattash
 Ilya Kovalchuk
Jens Pulver
 Max Scherzer
Michael Schwimer
Shane Warne

Authors, poets and writers

 Johann Wolfgang Goethe
 Les Murray
 Pacho O'Donnell

Dancers

Michael Flatley

Musicians and singers

 Awsten Knight, Waterparks
Tim McIlrath
 Russ
Mikey Way

Politicians

 Mike Ahern
 Anastasius I of the Byzantine Empire
 Harry M. Daugherty
 Terry McAuliffe

Scientists

Louis Émile Javal

Other

David Headley, AKA "Daood Sayed Gilani"
Barry Maranta, Australian businessman
Sarah McDaniel, American model
David Ridgen, CBC podcast host of Someone Knows Something

Notes

References

Eye color
Heterochromia, List of people with
heterochromia
Human iris